Camptomyces is a genus of fungi in the family Laboulbeniaceae. The genus contain 8 species.

References

External links
Camptomyces at Index Fungorum

Laboulbeniaceae
Laboulbeniales genera